Natalya Eduardovna Andreychenko (born May 3, 1956) is a Soviet and Russian actress. Her most famous roles include the title character in Mary Poppins, Goodbye and Lyuba in Wartime Romance. She has the title of Honored Artist of the RSFSR (1984).

Biography
Andreychenko decided to become an actress in early high school. After an unsuccessful attempt to get into the Mikhail Shchepkin Higher Theatre School, she was admitted to the Gerasimov Institute of Cinematography where she studied under Sergei Bondarchuk and Irina Skobtseva. In 1976 she appeared in her first films From Dawn Till Sunset and Kolybelnaya dlya Muzchin. Her first successful film role was in the 1979 epic film Siberiade, which received the special jury prize at the Cannes Film Festival. However, Natalya became more popular in the Soviet Union after her roles in Mary Poppins, Goodbye and Wartime Romance, both feature films released in 1983.

Personal life
From her first marriage to the Russian composer Maksim Dunayevsky she had a son named Dmitry (born 1982), a banker by profession. In 1985–2005 she was married to the Austrian/Swiss actor, writer, producer and director Maximilian Schell, with whom she made the film Little Odessa. They have one daughter together, Anastasia Schell.

She is a vegetarian, practices a raw food diet, and is engaged in yoga.

Filmography

 From Dawn Till Sunset (1975) as Valya
 Stepan's Remembrance (1976) as Tanyushka
 Dolgi nashi (Our debts) (1976)
 Kolybelnaya dlya muzhchin (Lullaby for men) (1977) as Valya Krylova
 The Steppe (1978) as Girl 
 Zhnetsy (1978) as Mariya
 Ukhodya – ukhodi (If you're going away – then go) (1978)
 Torgovka i poet (Saleswoman and a Poet) (1979)
 Siberiade (1979) as Nastya Solomina
 Priletal marsianin v osennyuyu noch (1979)
 Koney na pereprave ne menyayut (1980)
 Ladies Invite Gentlemen (1981) as Raisa
 Chelovek, kotoryy zakryl gorod (A Man Who Has Closed the City) (1982) as Nina Lazareva
 Lyudmila (1982)
 Wartime Romance (1983) as Lyuba
 Dvoe pod odnim zontom: Aprelskaya skazka (Two under a one umbrella) (1983) as Lyudmila
 Meri Poppins, do svidaniya (1984, TV Movie) as Mary Poppins
 Maritsa (1985, TV Movie) as Maritsa
 Peter the Great (1986, TV Mini-Series) as Eudoxia 
 Forgive Me (1986) as Maria
 Lady Macbeth of the Mtsensk District (1989) as Yekaterina 
 Candles in the Dark (1993, TV Movie) as Marta Velliste
 Ne idet... (1994)
 Little Odessa (1994) as Natasha 
 Aurora: Operation Intercept (1995) as Francesca Zaborszin
 Dr. Quinn, Medicine Woman (1997, TV Series) as Princess Nizamova
 Modern Vampires (1998, TV Movie) as Panthia
 8 ½ $ (1999) as Kseniya
 NYPD Blue (2000, TV Series) as Leah Shenkov
 Give Me Moonlight (2001)
 Down House (2001)
 O'key (2002)
 My Big Armenian Wedding (2004, TV Mini-Series) as Lena's Mother
  (2006, TV Mini-Series) as Dariya
 Ochen russkiy detektiv (2008)
 Na kryshe mira(2008) as Elena Naumova

Self
 Meine Schwester Maria (2002) as Natascha Schell

References

External links

Pictures of Andreychenko at google images

1956 births
Living people
Soviet film actresses
Russian film actresses
Russian Christians
Actresses from Moscow
20th-century Russian actresses
21st-century Russian actresses
Gerasimov Institute of Cinematography alumni
Recipients of the Lenin Komsomol Prize
Honored Artists of the RSFSR